Brooks County is the name of two counties in the United States:

 Brooks County, Georgia 
 Brooks County, Texas